T. S. Raghavendra (19 September 1945 – 30 January 2020) was an Indian actor, playback singer and occasional music director who concentrated on Tamil-language films. As an actor, he was known as the father character of actress Revathi in Vaidehi Kathirunthal.

He also gave music for a few films like Uyir (old Tamil film), Padikkatha Paadam and Yaaga Saalai.

Personal life
His wife Sulochana is also a singer His daughter Shekinah Shawn (born Prasanna Raghavendar) who is popular as an Opera singer and daughter Kalpana is also playback singer.

Filmography

As Actor

As Music Director

TelevisionSerials 
 1999 Pushpanjali
2000-2001 Anandha Bhavan - Ganga's father-in-law  
2004-2009 Kolangal - "Church Father" Rafael
2007-2008 Athi Pookal - Easwari's father-in-law

References 

Indian male film actors
2020 deaths
Tamil film score composers
Male actors in Tamil cinema
1945 births